Caldera OpenLinux (COL) is a defunct Linux distribution. Caldera originally introduced it in 1997 based on the German LST Power Linux distribution, and then taken over and further developed by Caldera Systems (now SCO Group) since 1998. A successor to the Caldera Network Desktop put together by Caldera since 1995, OpenLinux was an early "business-oriented distribution" and foreshadowed the direction of developments that came to most other distributions and the Linux community generally.

Novell Corsair
Corsair, a user interface for NetWare, was a project run by Novell corporation's Advanced Technology Group (ATG) between 1993 and 1995. Novell wanted a desktop environment with internet connectivity and conducted research on how to better and more easily integrate and manage network access for users. Windows' own support for connecting to Novell networks would not be improved until later releases and the Internet was dominated by Unix-based operating systems. Relative to their needs, Novell deemed the Unixes of the day were too hardware intensive, too large, and charged too much in license fees.

This group became convinced that Linux offered the best possible answer for the OS component. There were many other components as well, and these were of particular interest:
 Willows, a Microsoft Windows-compatible API for Unix systems to allow recompilation of Windows programs for Linux.
 Wine, a compatibility layer for running Windows and DOS software
 Ferret, a meeting browser
 WordPerfect, a then cross-platform word processing application bought by Novell in June 1994

On 5 April 1994, the Board of Novell hired Robert Frankenberg, the general manager of Hewlett-Packard Personal Information Products Group to replace Raymond John Noorda as CEO of Novell. Novell's stock price had performed poorly recently due to flagging growth. At Novell, the Network division (NSG) was growing at a pace of 19% per year, the Unix business division (USG) was flat, and the Desktop Applications division (DSG) was shrinking at a rate of $400 million per year.

Frankenberg's initiative was to refocus the company on networking and networking services. In terms of Corsair, that meant shedding most of the pieces. The Advanced Technology Group was disbanded, which shut down Willows and the OS project. Negotiations started which would eventually lead to WordPerfect being sold off to Corel in January 1996. Ferret was in line with the new direction and this component was kept within Novell.

Through his Noorda Family Trust (NFT), Ray Noorda had founded a venture capital investment group called the Canopy Group two years earlier in 1992. He thought there was substantial promise in both the OS project and the Willows project. He created two companies, to continue the work started at Novell. The "API company" was called Willows Software, Inc. (founded 1993) and the "OS company" became Caldera, Inc. (founded in October 1994 and incorporated in January 1995).

Noorda's early vision for Caldera was to create an IPX-based version of Linux which would license the key components, and resell this technology back to Novell to continue the Internet Desktop. In effect, in 1994 Caldera started life as kind of an outsourcing project for Novell, based on a technology demo named Exposé. Caldera started with ten employees and most were from Novell: Bryan Wayne Sparks, founder/president (Novell); Bryce J. Burns, chief operations officer (Novell); Ransom H. Love, VP marketing (Novell); Greg Page, VP engineering (Bell Labs, AT&T); and Craig Bradley, VP Sales (Lotus, Word Perfect).

Caldera Network Desktop

At this point in 1995 Ransom Love and Ray Noorda took note of the technologies that Caldera put together, specifically:
 Caldera built on the Linux kernel which ran on x86, PowerPC and Alpha architectures. Caldera Network Desktop was based on Red Hat Commercial Linux.
 Its wide area networking was far more advanced than the Microsoft networked OSes at the time (Windows for Workgroups 3.11 and Windows NT 3.51), due to its being Unix-like.
 Caldera included a version of Novell's IPX network protocol and a client for NetWare.
 The Willows Application Programming Interface for Windows (APIW) code written for Caldera's operating system would run on Unix, Microsoft Windows, and Apple Macintosh, as well as Caldera's system itself.
 Caldera also incorporated LISA (Linux Installation and System Administration), which had been developed by the German Linux Support Team (LST) for their own Linux distribution.

More than just a component for Novell, Caldera had assembled the components needed to create a VAR platform. However, Caldera faced a bootstrapping problem. OEM VAR applications often depended crucially on other companies' commercial applications. Since these other applications hadn't been ported to Linux yet, they couldn't meaningfully port their own applications. Caldera responded by creating a binary applications package, which allowed Linux to run UnixWare and OpenServer applications, the Linux Application Binary Interface (ABI) project, and by assisting Santa Cruz Operation (SCO) in creating the Linux Kernel Personalities. Linux Kernel Personalities was worked on to bring Linux application compatibility to SCO Unix (formerly UnixWare) and OpenServer. "The idea was to enable developers to write for both, Unix and Linux, with a common Application Programming Interface (API) and common Application Binary Interface (ABI). That way, developers didn't have to work so hard, and Unix users, the client base we inherited from SCO, could run Linux applications."

Caldera also supported Alan Cox in his work on SMP. If Linux displaced Unix on the Intel x86 platform, then Sun Microsystems wouldn't have a low-end Unix path. This point becomes more interesting in light of SCO's litigation eight years later against IBM in 2003. That is, IBM was not the company involved in the SMP work, and moreover, the company most directly involved is the company that later became the SCO Group, essentially SCO suing IBM for work it itself did.

In 1995, when XFree86 was still very hard to configure and unreliable on most chipsets, Caldera had shipped with MetroLink's Motif and XI Graphic's Accelerated-X.

Known releases:
 Caldera Network Desktop 1.0 Preview I (1995-05)
 Caldera Network Desktop 1.0 Preview II (1995-09) with Linux kernel 1.2.13
 Caldera Network Desktop 1.0 (scheduled for 1995-11, released 1996-02-05)
 Caldera Network Desktop Bundle (scheduled for 1995-12, released 1996-02-05)

Caldera Network Desktop was produced and sold until March 1997.

Caldera OpenLinux

During 1996, Caldera continued to be a valuable player, for example, on 23 May 1996, at the Linux Kongress in Berlin, Germany, Caldera announced its plans to obtain POSIX and FIPS certifications and the X/Open brand for UNIX 95 and XPG4 BASE 95 for the Linux operating system kernel and "Open Linux".

In contrast to CND OpenLinux was based on LST Power Linux, a Slackware-derived distribution that had been maintained by Linux Support Team since 1993 and the first to come with a Linux 2.0 kernel. In 1996 Linux Support Team grew into Stefan Probst's and Ralf Flaxa's company LST Software GmbH (with LST now standing for Linux System Technology) in Erlangen, Germany. The OpenLinux development led them to become Caldera's German development center Caldera Deutschland GmbH since May 1997.

On 23 July 1996, Caldera purchased Novell DOS and the remaining Digital Research assets from Novell in order to bundle a DOS with their version of Linux, which led to creating the OpenDOS distribution to help port DOS applications.

Caldera supported the Linux-port of StarOffice 3.1 with ca. 800.000 DM in order to offer the product with their forthcoming OpenLinux distribution in 1997.

By 1997, when the OpenLinux distribution was first released, Caldera had taken on the form that it would be most remembered for. Caldera had switched over to the high end Linux product. The "business" Linux distribution became more rich with features with bundled proprietary software. However, it became less community oriented and was released less frequently than other Linuxes did. Other differences included automated configuration for administration tools, paid technical support staff, built-in consistent default GUI, and a range of supported applications.

Over the next five years, Caldera Systems offered additional commercial extensions to Linux. They licensed Sun's Wabi to allow people to run Windows applications under Linux. Additionally, they shipped with Linux versions of WordPerfect (from Novell and later Corel) and CorelDRAW. Since many of their customers used a dual boot setup and FIPS was unreliable, they shipped with PowerQuest's PartitionMagic to allow their customers to non-destructively repartition their hard disks.

In partnership with IBM they produced the first Linux distribution which was DB2 compatible. With the Oracle Corporation they became the target platform for the Linux port of the Oracle database.

Other ventures included starting the Blackdown Java project, and creating professional certification.

They also formed strong partnerships with SCO's value-added reseller market and started laying the groundwork for OEM sales of Unix-based vertical applications.

Caldera Systems offered three versions of OpenLinux:
 OpenLinux Lite was a freely downloadable version.
 OpenLinux Base was a USD 99 version with a few extensions.
 OpenLinux Standard was USD 299 and was their fully featured product.

In addition to other people's applications, they created many Linux extensions to fill voids where no other commercial company was.  Caldera Systems began working on a Linux equivalent of replacing the Microsoft Exchange Server and Microsoft Outlook that would eventually become Volution Messaging Server, which offered calendaring/scheduling options with shared busy/free information, SSL support for e-mail and easy configuration. Additionally, Caldera Deutschland created the first fully graphical installer for Linux, called Lizard, starting in November 1998. They invented browser-based Unix system administration, created the webmin project, and employed its developer Jamie Cameron between 1999 and 2001.

Caldera Systems created a full featured GUI system administration tool called Caldera Open Administration System (COAS). The tool was a unified, easy to use administration tool with a modular design. With its scalability and broad scope abilities, it featured:
 Portability (specifics encapsulated in a platform repository)
 Open development model
 Flexible module licensing
 Multiple user interfaces (batch processing, ncurses, QT, Java)
 Scripting interface (Python) for rapid prototyping
 Backward compatibility (works on native files, "vi admin" friendly)

OpenLinux showed the Linux community what would be required to create a mainstream desktop OS out of the Linux kernel. In many ways the last ten years of desktop progress has been to successfully implement what Caldera was attempting to do with the tools they had available using open source software in place of the closed applications. Their technique for this was to utilize commercial software to fill in the largest gaps making their product a "value add" and thus they could charge for it. It made them the most commercial and at the same time it made them the most advanced distribution available.

The desktop company became Caldera International under the direction of Ransom Love.

The focus for the desktop company became mainly marketing and business relationships. There were several reasons for this. The first was that Caldera had won a $280 million lawsuit against Microsoft for DR-DOS and was flush with cash. Secondly, while the Caldera distribution was good, its primary advantages were the use of technologies not owned by Caldera and thus if Caldera were successful its success could (from a technical standpoint) be imitated, by Red Hat, SUSE, TurboLinux, etc. Third, for years Caldera had been competing directly with SCO Unix, but by 1997 Linux outperformed SCO in almost every respect.  Making the choice to switch from SCO to Caldera was not a "no-brainer" for companies because that also meant a switch of vendors and support organizations. Caldera's SCO acquisition was aimed at eliminating this problem. That is Caldera International's corporate direction became to combine SCO's distribution, marketing and VAR arm with LAMP, and use Project Monterey to develop a 64-bit strategy. What SCO offered was:
 A strong list of business clients.
 Higher compatibility between SCO and Linux than any other Unix/Linux combination, mainly as a result of Caldera's long standing SCO focus that created products like ABI and thus resulted in ports of SCO code to Linux
 A good back-office and database solution while Linux specialized in networking (LAMP) and client desktop, a very appealing combination in challenging Sun and Microsoft
 A global infrastructure (presence in about 80 countries), Caldera was domestic
 Thousands of business applications targeted to vertical markets
 Some of the 3rd party components needed to get HP-UX, AIX, Solaris 3rd party Java applications ported to Linux

From a technical standpoint however Caldera OpenLinux really shone during the Ransom Love years. Their commercial bundling solution continued to work. They had a powerful low bug (by Linux standards) distribution that worked well on a wide range of hardware. They charged a great deal relative to other distributions and were able to generate a very strong profit. Red Hat pulled way ahead of them in terms of US sales and on the global sales front they trailed SUSE and TurboLinux as well, but financially due to the DR-DOS settlement they were the strongest of all the Linux distributions.

Known releases (incomplete):

 Caldera OpenLinux Lite/Base/Standard(/Deluxe) 1.0 (1997) with Linux kernel 2.0.25
 Caldera OpenLinux Lite/Base/Standard 1.1 (1997)
 Caldera OpenLinux Lite/Base/Standard 1.2 (1998-04-17)
 Caldera Systems OpenLinux Lite/Base 1.3 (1998-09-28) with Linux kernel 2.0.35
 Caldera Systems OpenLinux 1.4

 Caldera Systems OpenLinux 2.2 (1999-04-19) with Linux kernel 2.2.xx
 Caldera Systems OpenLinux eDesktop/eServer 2.3 (1999) with Linux kernel 2.2.10
 Caldera Systems OpenLinux eServer 2.3.1
 Caldera Systems OpenLinux eDesktop/eBuilder 2.4
 Caldera Systems OpenLinux eBuilder 3.0
 Caldera International OpenLinux Workstation/Server 3.1 (2001) with Linux kernel 2.4.2
 Caldera International OpenLinux Workstation/Server 3.1.1 (2002) with Linux kernel 2.4.xx

Other products:
 Caldera NetWare for Linux 1.0 (1998)

United Linux

Caldera Systems quickly found itself in a classic business problem where the interests of the existing business conflicted with their growth model. Santa Cruz Operation (SCO) was a much larger company than Caldera Systems had been, and in fact of the $71 million of revenue 90% was from the SCO side of the business. Moreover, Caldera Systems costs $4 in marketing to generate a $1 in sales, SCO was mature and sold itself (mainly to repeat customers). The VAR relationship was even more problematic. Caldera Systems had always sold the "Linux is SCO but better" model and had done everything possible to make the transition from SCO to Caldera Systems relatively seamless. Each of the 14,000 SCO resellers made much more from each SCO sale than from sales of Caldera Systems, so they were not anxious to move existing customers from SCO to Linux; and even those, that were supportive of Linux, saw no strong value add for Caldera Systems and often sold Red Hat Enterprise Linux. Caldera Systems had two businesses in direct competition, one, which was a shrinking, but still profitable Unix business, the other a rapidly growing business, that was still hemorrhaging money.

The most logical solution was to establish Caldera Systems as the premier Linux brand. Without the threat from Red Hat, transitioning resellers from SCO to Caldera Systems would be much easier. With this in mind Ransom Love formed an alliance of large business oriented Linux distributions which utilized the KDE desktop, called United Linux. The alliance comprised Caldera International, SUSE Linux, Turbolinux, and Conectiva. Filings from Novell in the SCO Group SCO v. Novell lawsuit showed that this was more than simply a marketing gimmick, and was a real alliance.

Business responded favorably to the movement as IBM and AMD quickly formed partnerships. The Linux Professional Institute adopted United Linux as their standard distribution for training. For the first time there was a Linux distribution with:
 Global scope
 Global support at the VAR, OEM and distribution level
 A full training organization
 Some governmental buy-in
 Support from major corporations
 Enterprise applications like Oracle supported out of the box
 An actual production GUI that ran well on a variety of hardware

SUSE Linux had the engineering, as it had continued to maintain a large technical staff, Caldera International had the global support organization, and Turbo Linux as well as Conectiva brought with growth potential into less flooded markets. This merger was so successful, that Love and Sparks could claim vindication that year when Novell reversed the Frankenberg decision and brought United Linux engineering talent back into the fold with the acquisition of SUSE.

United Linux was rejected by the broader Linux community; the use of per-seat licensing was their most highly controversial decision. More importantly, by the time United Linux was released, Darl McBride had become CEO of Caldera International and the focus had shifted away from Linux.

Caldera International at this point released a Caldera "Linux distribution" with the OpenUNIX 8 kernel instead of the Linux kernel. Unix has TLI and STREAMS support, which made writing drivers easier. Caldera International proved this by replacing the kernel and yet not having to change much else on a full featured desktop and server "Linux".

Copyright infringement allegations

In 2002, the Caldera International board of directors, including Ralph Yarro, named Darl McBride, formerly with Franklin-Covey, as CEO. The company was renamed The SCO Group. Ransom Love was reassigned to work exclusively on United Linux. After he completed this, he left the company to join Progeny Linux Systems which was aiming to create a professional Debian. He remained there in the capacity of a board member and advisor until 30 April 2007 when Progeny ceased operations.

McBride began to focus on SCO's copyrights. One of McBride's first acts as CEO was to collect $600,000 in back licensing fees that were owed to Caldera International. He cleaned up various Linux-related licensing issues allowing for a new round of financing. Soon thereafter he made strong accusations that Linux had infringed copyrights SCO held on Unix; they claimed to have purchased these copyrights from Novell. Novell denied selling them the Unix copyright, prompting them to sue for slander of title. SCO also initiated lawsuits against IBM and AutoZone, alleging copyright infringements through the use or distribution of Linux; none of these lawsuits have been resolved. SCO has created a division, SCOsource, that owns and licenses their intellectual property; a desktop license is $699.

See also
 Caldera Systems Smallfoot
 Lineo Embedix
 Novell SUSE Linux
 Novell UnixWare
 Star Trek project
 Caldera DR-WebSpyder

Notes

References

Further reading
 Ransom Love on the SCO merger
 More on finances of the SCO merger
 Darl McBride's early successes in the IP battles
 Ransom Love editorial on the value of the Linux Standard Base
 In addition to the litigation SCO initiated Red Hat has sued SCO
 December 1995 review of Caldera Desktop Linux
 A comparative review from seven months later

External links
 Groklaw has an extended discussion of the Linux ABI
 An advertisement white-paper from March 2001 Red Hat to Caldera. This pushes the "product not a distribution" philosophy.
 Ralf Flaxa's LST was a major contributor for the original Caldera Desktop

Caldera (company) operating systems
Discontinued Linux distributions
SCO–Linux disputes
Linux distributions